Killer Crocodile is a 1989 Italian natural horror film directed by Fabrizio De Angelis (credited as Larry Ludman), about a large crocodile that mutates when exposed to large quantities of toxic waste, which has been dumped in the water where it lives. The film stars Richard Anthony Crenna (son of actor Richard Crenna) and was followed by a sequel, Killer Crocodile II, in 1990.

Plot
A group of environmentalists investigating the illegal dumping of toxic chemicals in a swamp must defend themselves against an abnormally huge crocodile, which has become more aggressive than usual due to prolonged exposure to the toxic waste. The crocodile kills many people, but ultimately the heroes throw a boat propeller into its mouth, after which the crocodile explodes.

Cast 
 Richard Anthony Crenna as Kevin
 Julian Hampton as Mark
 John Harper as Bob
 Sherrie Rose as Pamela
 Ann Douglas as Jennifer
 Thomas Moore as Joe
 Van Johnson as Judge
 Wohrman Williams as Foley

Production
The film was shot back-to-back with its sequel Killer Crocodile 2 in the Dominican Republic. It was filmed on 35mm film.

Home media
The film was released on DVD and Blu-ray in the U.S. on September 24, 2019 by Severin Films. There will also be a limited edition Blu-ray containing the sequel. This marks both film's first home media release in the United States. It is available for streaming, alongside its sequel, on Tubi.

See also
List of killer crocodile films

References

External links

1989 horror films
English-language Italian films
Italian science fiction horror films
Films about crocodilians
1989 films
Films scored by Riz Ortolani
Films directed by Fabrizio De Angelis
1980s English-language films
1980s Italian films